Przevalski's nuthatch (Sitta przewalskii), originally given the nomen nudum Sitta eckloni, is a bird species in the family Sittidae, collectively known as nuthatches. Long regarded as a subspecies of the white-cheeked nuthatch (Sitta leucopsis), it nevertheless differs significantly in morphology and vocalizations. Both S. przewalskii and S. leucopsis have been regarded as closely related to the North American white-breasted nuthatch (Sitta carolinensis). Its upper body is a dark gray-blue or slate color, becoming dark blue-black at the crown. The cheeks and throat are a white buff-orange, turning to a rich cinnamon on the underparts that intensifies in color on the sides of the breast. Vocalizations consist of alternating series of ascending whistles and short notes.

The bird is endemic to areas in southeastern Tibet and west central China, including eastern Qinghai, Gansu and Sichuan, inhabiting coniferous montane forest of spruce or fir. The species was first described in 1891 from a specimen collected in China's Haidong Prefecture. The common name and Latin binomial commemorate the Russian explorer Nikolay Przhevalsky, who first recorded the species in 1884. Little is known about its ecology, which is probably comparable to that of the white-cheeked nuthatch.
 
It was given the rank of full species (separate from the white-cheeked nuthatch) in 2005 in Pamela C. Rasmussen's Birds of South Asia. The Ripley Guide. Other authorities followed suit, but as of 2014, S. przewalskii does not have a full threat-status evaluation by BirdLife International or the International Union for Conservation of Nature. A 2014 phylogenetic study of the species found it to be at the base of the nuthatch evolutionary tree out of 21 species examined, dispelling a hypothesis that S. przewalskii could belong to the same species as S. carolinensis.

Taxonomy 

The nuthatches constitute a genus – Sitta – of small passerine birds in the family Sittidae. The genus may be further divided into seven subgenera, of which S. przewalskii belongs to Leptositta, along with its nominate subspecies, Sitta leucopsis, and the white-breasted nuthatch (Sitta carolinensis). Nuthatches are typified by short, compressed wings and short, square 12-feathered tails, compact bodies, longish pointed , strong toes with long claws, and behaviorally, by their unique head-first manner of descending tree trunks. Most nuthatches have gray or blue  and a black . (One recognizable feature of Przevalski's nuthatch is that it lacks the eyestripe common to most nuthatch species.)

Sitta is derived from the Ancient Greek name for nuthatches, . "Nuthatch", first recorded in 1350, is derived from "nut" and a word probably related to "hack", since these birds hack at nuts they have wedged into crevices.

Sitta przewalskii was first scientifically described in 1891 by Russians Mikhail Mikhailovich Berezovsky and Valentin Bianchi based on a single specimen obtained in the Haidong Prefecture, in Eastern Qinghai. The common name and Latin binomial commemorate the Russian explorer Nikolay Przhevalsky, who found the species in Tibet in 1884 and dubbed it  Sitta eckloni  without providing adequate description, rendering it a nomen nudum. Though the primary habitats of Sitta przewalskii and the white-cheeked nuthatch (Sitta leucopsis) are separated from each other by almost , Przevalski's nuthatch was described as closely related to the white-cheeked nuthatch, and was thereafter often considered and treated conspecifically, as a subspecies of S. leucopsis.

In 2005, Pamela C. Rasmussen granted the taxon autonomous status in her book, Birds of South Asia. The Ripley Guide, uncoupling the species from S. leucopsis. The classification was noted by ornithologists Nigel J. Collar and John D. Pilgrim in 2007, and endorsed by the International Ornithological Congress, by Alan P. Peterson in his well-known Zoological Nomenclature Resource (Zoonomen), and by the Internet Bird Collection (IBC), sponsored by the Handbook of the Birds of the World. No subspecies of S. przewalskii itself have been identified.

In explaining this separation of species, Rasmussen points to morphological divergence and significant differences in vocalization. Ornithologist Edward C. Dickinson observed in a 2006 article that though evidence of morphological and vocal differences between S. przewalskii and S. leucopsis have been delineated, little had yet been published presenting comparative morphological details, and that it would be instructive to study how each taxon responds to the calls of the other.

The white-cheeked nuthatch, with S. przewalskii subsumed within it, has been regarded as closely related to the North American white-breasted nuthatch (Sitta carolinensis), which has a similar contact call (though S. carolinensisss is moderately higher in pitch), and they have sometimes been treated as conspecific. In turn, it has been proposed that the triumvirate of S. przewalskii, S. leucopsis and S. carolinensis could be related to the Sitta canadensis, monophyletic group, corresponding to the subgenus Micrositta, which includes six species of average-sized nuthatches. The relationships remain very unclear. A molecular study by Eric Pasquet conducted in 2014 may provide some clarity.

In 2014, Eric Pasquet, et al. published a phylogeny based on examination of nuclear and mitochondrial DNA of 21 nuthatch species. Though S. leucopsis was not included in the study, it found that within the nuthatch group covered, S. przewalskii is basal—an ancestor at the base (or root)—to the nuthatch evolutionary family tree, and thus "sister to all other nuthatches, without any close relatives". The findings resulted from phylogenetic analyses (employing Bayesian inference and the maximum likelihood methods). A biogeographical analysis (using the dispersal-extinction–cladogenesis model) was then performed. The cladogram drawn from the evidence indicates that the first clade and closest descendants of Przevalski's nuthatch are the North American white-breasted nuthatch and the giant nuthatch (S. magna), dispelling the hypothesis that S. przewalskii could belong to the same species as S. carolinensis.

Description 

Because Sitta przewalskii has long been regarded as a subspecies of the white-cheeked nuthatch, its description has often been made in comparison with it. Though both species lack the black eyestripe typical of other nuthatches, their coloring is distinct, with S. leucopsis being white- or creamy-buff on its throat, cheeks, breast, flanks and belly, where S. przewalskii has varying shades and concentrations of cinnamon. S. przewalskii is also the smaller of the two, and its  is markedly thinner. Males and females of the species are nearly identical in appearance, except for the male's brighter cinnamon coloring.

The secondaries and inner primaries are fringed in gray-blue. The central rectrices are gray-blue, and the outer  are a blackish-gray, paling towards the tips.

Below, the belly and breast are a rich cinnamon, darkening to an orange-cinnamon at the sides of the breast. The rear  and  feathers are rufous. The iris and legs are dark brown. Juveniles of the species resemble adults but for the base of their beaks being yellow, proportionately shorter, and their overall coloring being less vibrant.

Vocalizations and behavior 

Sitta przewalskii's territorial calls differ significantly from those of S. leucopsis, whose notes are more nasal, whereas the song of S. przewalskii is in long verses composed of whistles that ascend in pitch, interspersed with short notes. According to the Handbook of the Birds of the World, vocalizations include a "muffled, mellow 'chip' repeated in irregular series...; a loud, emphatic, whistled 'dweep' or 'dweep-eep'; a slightly nasal, querulous 'que', usually repeated 3–5 times...; and thinner 'pee-pee-pee-pee...' or 'seet-seet-seet-seet...' notes on [the] same pitch but slowing towards [the] end of [the] phrase."

In 1950, English naturalist Frank Ludlow reported a description of the bird, as provided to him by Ernst Schäfer who studied an adult male near Litang in 1934. It was characterized as: "one of the shyest and rarest denizens of the conifer forest", and one leading a solitary life, much like nearby populations of three-toed woodpeckers (Picoides tridactylus funebris). By contrast, Ludlow observed the species in southeastern Tibet, probably during the winter, and did not find it particularly reserved. He reports having killed a specimen in a willow tree, far from the species' usual coniferous nesting grounds. The specimen was captured on the outskirts of a forest, on a ridge between two valleys, where it stood on a dead branch from which it launched in pursuit of insects in flight, like a flycatcher.

Distribution and habitat 

The species is endemic to an area in west central China and southeastern Tibet. In China, it is found in eastern Qinghai, from the Daba Mountains as far north as the Menyuan Hui Autonomous County, and as far south as the plateau of Amdo (35° N. 101° E.), as well as in the southern part of Qinghai in Nangqên County; in the area of the Yellow River in Xinghai County; in Gansu, southwest of Xiahe and Min counties; in Sichuan, where it has been observed in the north, center and west of the province, including sightings in Songpan County at the Jiuzhaigou Valley nature reserve, in the Qionglai Mountains in the Wolong District, in the region of Barkam County, and in the area of Litang. The species has also been observed in Kunming, Yunnan, in far southwestern China, where it most likely migrates to overwinter.

In Tibet, the species has been found in the northeastern Tibet Autonomous Region in the Chamdo Prefecture; and in the southeast of the region in Tse (in December) and in Dzeng (in April), both in the South Tibet (Tsangpo) Valley region. The Tsangpo Valley sightings may be anomalous, only indicating winter visitation. The bird observed in Dzeng was in an environment alien to the species' normal coniferous forest environs, and both the Dzeng and Tse individuals had atypically pale underparts, indicating they may have been nominate S. leucopsis, but with genetic introgression traits from Przevalski's nuthatch.

S. przewalskii inhabits coniferous montane forest of spruce or fir. Its altitudinal range commonly approaches a forest's tree line. In western Nepal a range of  has been described.

Threats and protection 
Sitta przewalskii is not yet treated as an independent species by BirdLife International or the International Union for Conservation of Nature, and its threat level is not evaluated by either. Despite being described as rare in China and Southeast Tibet, because the taxon is treated instead as a subspecies of S. leucopsis, the evaluation of its population incorporates the relative abundance of its parent species. Concomitantly, it takes on its parent category of least concern. As S. przewalskii has not been extensively studied independently from S. leucopsis, a classification of data deficient could be applied, but the rarity of sightings indicates concern for its status; a finding of near threatened or even classification as a vulnerable species may be warranted.

Notes and references

Notes

References

Bibliography

External links 

 

Przevalski's nuthatch
Birds of Central China
Birds of Tibet
Birds of Yunnan
Endemic birds of China
Przevalski's nuthatch